Christopher "Kipper" Williams (born 30 December 1951) is a cartoonist who draws for newspapers, magazines, audio visual presentations and greetings cards. His clients include The Guardian, the Sunday Times, the Spectator, Private Eye, Country Life, John Lewis Gazette, Broadcast, Engineering and Technology, Radio Times, Coaching at Work, and Fitzrovia News.

He was born on the Wirral, Cheshire, on 30 December 1951, the son of Aubrey Williams, a local government officer. His nickname "Kipper" came from a childhood pronunciation of "Christopher." He attended Ellesmere Port Grammar School, and from 1970 to 1974 studied fine art at Leeds University, where, he remembered, "cartoons were my reaction against traditional fine art and painting." At Leeds he was a friend of Steve Bell.

References

British editorial cartoonists
People from the Metropolitan Borough of Wirral
Alumni of the University of Leeds
The Spectator people
1951 births
Living people